The Boyne Valley is a rural locality in Gladstone Region, Queensland, Australia. The locality contains four small towns: Nagoorin, Ubobo, Builyan, and Many Peaks. At the 2021 census the population had dropped to 301.

Geography 
"The Valley" as locals call it, is part of Gladstone's hinterland. Formerly within the Shire of Calliope, in 2008 it became part of Gladstone Region. It is in close proximity to Kroombit Tops National Park.

The Gladstone–Monto Road runs through from north to south-west.

History
Nagoorin State School opened on 18 October 1915.

Builyan State School opened on 4 December 1922.

Ubobo State School opened on 23 March 1927.

The Gladstone to Monto railway line opened its  first section from Byellee (previously known as Boyne Valley Junction) to Many Peaks on 25 July 1910 with the following stations on the line within Boyne Valley:

 Wietalaba railway station
 Nagoorin railway station
 Ubobo railway station
 Hellens railway station
 Littlemore railway station
 Builyan railway station
 Many Peaks railway station

with the second section to Barrimoon completed on 17 August 1926 including:

 Golembil railway station

The line closed to regular services in 2002 with the final train on the line being a steam special run from Monto to Maryborough in 2005.

At the 2006 census, Boyne Valley had a population of 646.

In the 2011 census, Boyne Valley had a population of 379 people.

Heritage listings 
Boyne Valley has a number of heritage-listed sites, including:

 Gladstone-Monto Road, Ubobo: Soldier Settler House
Norton Road, Nagoorin: Norton Goldfield
 5 Railway Terrace, Ubobo: Ububo QCWA
 7 Railway Terrace: the Ubobo Station Mistress's Residence is now used as the headquarters of the Boyne Valley Historical Society

Education 
Ubobo State School is a government primary (Prep-6) school for boys and girls at Cedarvale Road. In 2017, the school had an enrolment of 12 students with 3 teachers (2 full-time equivalent) and 4 non-teaching staff (2 full-time equivalent). The school was temporarily closed in late 2019 due to a lack of enrolments, and remains closed as of July 2022.

Builyan State School is a government primary (Prep-6) school for boys and girls at Gladstone Road. In 2017, the school had an enrolment of 8 students with 2 teachers (1 full-time equivalent) and 4 non-teaching staff (2 full-time equivalent). Enrolments increased to 10 students in February 2021.

Nagoorin State School is a government primary (Prep-6) school for boys and girls at 2 Ubobo Street. In 2017, the school had an enrolment of 12 students with 2 teachers (1 full-time equivalent) and 4 non-teaching staff (2 full-time equivalent). Enrolments increased to 23 students in February 2021.

The three schools get together on a regular basis, providing students with the opportunity to learn and socialise with children of a similar age.

There are no secondary schools in Boyne Valley. The nearest is Miriam Vale State School which offers secondary schooling to Year 10. For Years 11 and 12, the nearest schools are Gladstone State High School, Rosedale State School and Monto State High School.

Attractions 

 The Dawes Range Tunnel section of the Boyne Burnett Inland Rail Trail was opened on 11 September 2021. The  section starts at Barrimoon Siding, Kalpowar and finishes at Builyan, Boyne Valley.  This section contains 6 tunnels between Barrimoon Siding and Golembil Siding. It also passes the historic township of Many Peaks with its Local Heritage listed attractions - the Many Peaks Railway Complex, Many Peaks Railway Dam and Many Peaks Road Bridge.
 the Boyne Valley Historical Cottage, opened in 1988 by the Boyne Valley Historical Society Inc. The historical display. located at Railway Terrace, Ubobo, is open by appointment.

See also

 Beautiful Betsy
 Castle Tower National Park
 Kroombit Tops National Park
 Lake Awoonga
 List of valleys of Australia

References

External links

Boyne Valley, Queensland, Australia
History of Boyne Valley
Map of The Boyne Valley
University of Queensland: Queensland Places: Gladstone Localities

Valleys of Queensland
Gladstone Region
Localities in Queensland